Rubidium sulfate is a sulfate of rubidium. The molecular formula of the compound is Rb2SO4. The molecular weight of this compound is 266.999 g/mol. An acid sulfate of rubidium (rubidium hydrogen sulfate) can be formed.  It is soluble in water and is an aqueous solution.

Reactions

Y2(SO4)3 + Rb2SO4 → Rb3[Y(SO4)3] 
Rb2SO4 + H2SO4 → 2 RbHSO4

References

Sulfates
Rubidium compounds